Antagoras of Rhodes (born on Rhodes about 270 B.C.) was a Greek poet. He was also noted for his cookery.

Biographical information
Antagoras wrote a Theban epic whilst in Pella, and (extant) epigrams. Also was one of two attendant in the court of Antigonus II Gonatas, ruler of Macedonia
Famed for his repartee Antagoras was described by contemporaries as;

Conger eels account
Whilst on campaign in the Balkans, King Antigonos Gonatas—who had journeyed with Antagoras—found Antagoras inside camp to be cooking conger eels. When asked as to the likelihood of Homer being able to produce the Iliad should he have decided instead to use his time in cookery, Antagoras replied that he thought it unlikely that Agammemnon would have involved himself in any exploits at all if he had chosen to wander around his camp looking for men cooking conger eels.

In one account of the story Plutarch first writes of the value of seafood above the common staple (lentils) and, showing the relative costs of foods against each other, uses the examples of the persons Philoxenus the son of Eryxis, Androcydes the painter and Antagoras as examples for the preference of fish (a delicious food):

See also
 Thebaid (a region of ancient Egypt)
Thebais (a poem ) by Publius Papinius Statius
Θηβαΐς (Thebaid)

References

External links
Luard,E (2008) amazon.com open book showing traditional ways of cookery for the European peoples

Edward Phillips (1675)  page 20 of  Theatrum poetarum: or A compleat collection of the poets, especially the most eminent, of all ages. The antients distinguish't from the moderns in their several alphabets (Google eBook)

Year of death missing
Ancient Rhodian poets
Ancient Greek writers
3rd-century BC Rhodians
270s BC births